The Negros bleeding-heart pigeon (Gallicolumba keayi) is endemic to the Philippines where it is found on the islands of Negros and Panay. It is critically endangered; continuing rates of forest loss on the two islands where it occurs suggest that it will continue to decline. The population is estimated to be just 50 - 249 mature individuals. The species has an extremely small, severely fragmented population. The bird is listed as an EDGE species under the analysis of the Zoological Society of London.

It is considered one of the Western Visayas Big 5 which includes the Walden's hornbill, Visayan spotted deer, Visayan hornbill and the Visayan warty pig.

Description
Ebird describes it as "A very rare medium-sized ground dove of foothill forest floor on Negros and Panay. Iridescent greenish-blue on the head and sides to the chest, scaled on the upper back, with brownish flight feathers. White underparts narrow from the throat down the chest to the belly. Obvious white crescents mark the wing and sides of the chest. Note the red “bleeding heart” in the center of the chest. Unlikely to be mistaken if seen well. The only other dove likely to flush from the ground would be Asian emerald dove. Song is a short, accelerating series of low notes."

25 cm (10-in) is its total length. Ground-feeder but roosts and nests on bushes or vines; seen in pairs in a flock. Birds with enlarged gonads recorded in April and May and a recent fledgling obtained on May 3.

It has been recorded nesting in March - June with chicks fledging after only 12 days, apparently as an adaptation to the vulnerability of their open and low nests in epiphytic ferns. Nests appear to be regularly predated. The species predominantly feeds on plant material, although there is some potential evidence to suggest that they may also occasionally feed on ground invertebrates.

Habitat and Conservation Status 
The Negros bleeding-heart lives primarily in primary forest up to 1,200 meters above sea level.  They are sensitive to habitat disturbance and do not tolerate second growth as well but there are some sparse records..

It is critically endangered with the population estimated to be 50 -249 mature individuals remaining. They are threatened by hunting for food, trapping for the pet trade and habitat loss . Continuing rates of forest loss on the two islands where it occurs suggest that it will continue to decline. By 2007, Negros and Panay had a 3% and 6% remaining forest cover with most of this being higher elevation forest where this bird does not thrive in. Despite already paltry forest cover, deforestation still continues thanks to both legal and illegal logging, conversion into farmland, mining and road development.  Trapping and hunting for food and, presumably, for the cage-bird trade constitute other threats.

It was bred for the first time in captivity in 2007 at the Center for Tropical Conservation Studies.  As of 2013, the captive population totals 18 individuals, 14 of which have been bred from birds confiscated from the illegal bird trade.  Captive breeding is being undertaken by the Talarak Foundation supported by the Philippines Biodiversity Conservation Foundation. There are plans for future reintroductions.

Conservation actions proposed include fieldwork and surveys in areas where they have been reported and other areas with suitable habitats. Provide protection for existing habitats like the Northern Negros Forest reserve. Encourage reforestation activities with an emphasis on native trees. Create education and awareness campaigns to aid in conservation and prevent hunting and the pet trade.

References

External links
BirdLife Species Factsheet.

Negros bleeding-heart
Birds of Negros Island
Birds of Panay
Critically endangered biota of Asia
Negros bleeding-heart
Negros bleeding-heart